Curling at the 2013 Winter Universiade was held from December 12 to 20 at the Ice Rink Piné at Baselga di Piné in Trentino, Italy.

Medal summary

Medal table

Medalists

Qualification

Men

Women

Men

Teams

Round-robin standings
Final round-robin standings

Round-robin results

Draw 1
Thursday, December 12, 14:00

Draw 2
Friday, December 13, 9:00

Draw 3
Friday, December 13, 19:00

Draw 4
Saturday, December 14, 9:00

Draw 5
Sunday, December 15, 9:00

Draw 6
Sunday, December 15, 19:00

Draw 7
Monday, December 16, 14:00

Draw 8
Tuesday, December 17, 9:00

Draw 9
Tuesday, December 17, 19:00

Tiebreaker
Wednesday, December 18, 9:00

Playoffs

Semifinals
Thursday, December 19, 19:00

Bronze Medal Game
Thursday, December 19, 15:00

Gold Medal Game
Friday, December 20, 13:30

Women

Teams

Round-robin standings
Final round-robin standings

Round-robin results

Draw 1
Thursday, December 12, 9:00

Draw 2
Thursday, December 12, 19:00

Draw 3
Friday, December 13, 14:00

Draw 4
Saturday, December 14, 9:00

Draw 5
Saturday, December 14, 19:00

Draw 6
Sunday, December 15, 14:00

Draw 7
Monday, December 16, 9:00

Draw 8
Monday, December 16, 19:00

Draw 9
Tuesday, December 17, 14:00

Playoffs

Semifinals
Thursday, December 19, 9:00

Bronze Medal Game
Thursday, December 19, 15:00

Gold Medal Game
Friday, December 20, 9:00

References

External links
 
 Website at the World Curling Federation

 Result Book – Curling

Winter Universiade
2013
2013 Winter Universiade
International curling competitions hosted by Italy